The fifth season of Shameless, an American comedy-drama television series based on the British series of the same name by Paul Abbott, premiered on January 11, 2015 on the Showtime television network. Executive producers are John Wells, Paul Abbott and Andrew Stearn, and producer Michael Hissrich. Like all previous seasons, the season consisted of 12 episodes.

Plot
The season picks up two to three months after the events of the previous season. Fiona, officially off house arrest, is still a waitress at the Golden House diner, which has been renamed to Patsy's Pies and is now under the new ownership of Sean Pierce (Dermot Mulroney); Sheila leaves town after her house burns down; Frank, Sammi and Chuckie move into the Gallagher household; Mandy moves to Indiana with Kenyatta; and Ian remains in denial of his bipolarity as Mickey continues to look after him. When Ian begins showing increasingly erratic behavior, Mickey gets Ian to admit himself into a psychological evaluation ward.

Fiona begins a relationship with local musician Gus Pfender (Steve Kazee). After a one-week relationship, Fiona and Gus impulsively decide to get married. Her problems are compounded when Jimmy—going under the alias of Jack—suddenly returns to Chicago; Jimmy reveals that after boarding Nando's yacht, he had been forced to do slave labor in South America. Fiona has sex with Jimmy, who pleads with her to accompany him on a trip to Dubai, which she refuses. Jimmy later returns, stating that he cancelled the trip to stay with her; Fiona, recognizing the problems of their relationship, ends things with him for good. Fiona later learns from Jimmy's colleague Angela (Dichen Lachman), that the client had cancelled the Dubai trip—not Jimmy. Fiona and Gus' relationship strains following Fiona's infidelity, and Fiona ends up developing feelings for Sean, who is a recovering heroin addict.

Meanwhile, Debbie begins dating Derek, a boy she bonds with during boxing lessons. Debbie goes on birth control and has sex with Derek, despite being advised against doing so within 48 hours; this ultimately results in Debbie becoming pregnant, to Fiona's dismay. Lip and Amanda continue a non-exclusive relationship, though Amanda eventually begins showing feelings for Lip, which he ignores. When Lip pursues his older professor, Helene (Sasha Alexander), Amanda angrily lashes out at him for ditching her. Kevin and Veronica struggle with parental life, and the two go through a brief break-up period, in which Svetlana strikes an unlikely bond with Kevin. Kevin and Veronica eventually make amends at the end of the season.

At the Gallagher home, Sammi takes charge as the family's caretaker. She begins openly showing a disdain for Frank, her eyes opened to her father by her half-siblings. Frank wants to get rid of Sammi and convinces Carl, who has begun dealing drugs, to use Chuckie as a drug mule. In the second half of the season, Frank bonds with his doctor Bianca (Bojana Novakovic), who is diagnosed with pancreatic cancer. Bianca refuses to endure chemo, instead wanting to experience a debauched lifestyle that Frank introduces her to. They eventually begin a romantic relationship. As Bianca's health begins deteriorating, she and Frank take a trip to Costa Rica. While Frank is sleeping, Bianca leaves a thankful goodbye note for him before walking into the ocean to presumably drown herself.

Under Frank's advice, Carl gets an unaware Chuckie to transfer heroin, but Chuckie is quickly caught by the police. Enraged by Chuckie's arrest, Sammi turns on the Gallagher clan and calls the cops on Carl. In court, Chuckie is sentenced to ninety days in juvenile prison while Carl, refusing to give up his drug dealers, is sentenced to one year. In another attempt to get retribution on the Gallaghers, Sammi reports Ian to the military police for his military insubordination. Ian is subsequently arrested. Angered by Sammi's actions, Mickey vengefully drugs Sammi with roofies until she passes out unconscious. When Mickey wrongly assumes the roofies have killed Sammi, he and Debbie hide Sammi's body in a moving storage container. Meanwhile, Ian receives a visit from Monica, and the two briefly hitchhike out of the state after he is released.

Ian returns to the South Side and reunites with Mickey. However, Ian breaks up with him, affirming that he doesn't want to put Mickey through his bipolarity. The fifth season closes on a cliffhanger, with Sammi suddenly showing up and attempting to shoot Mickey with a gun. The shootout ultimately results in both Mickey and Sammi's incarceration.

Cast and characters

Main
 William H. Macy as Frank Gallagher
 Emmy Rossum as Fiona Gallagher
 Jeremy Allen White as Philip "Lip" Gallagher
 Ethan Cutkosky as Carl Gallagher
 Shanola Hampton as Veronica "V" Fisher
 Steve Howey as Kevin "Kev" Ball
 Emma Kenney as Debbie Gallagher
 Cameron Monaghan as Ian Gallagher
 Noel Fisher as Mickey Milkovich
 Emily Bergl as Samantha "Sammi" Slott

Special guest stars
 Joan Cusack as Sheila Gallagher
 Dermot Mulroney as Sean Pierce
 Steve Kazee as Gus Pfender
 Sasha Alexander as Helene Runyon Robinson

Recurring
 Kellen Michael as Chuckie Slott
 Justin Chatwin as Jimmy Lishman
 Bojana Novakovic as Bianca Samson
 Chloe Webb as Monica Gallagher
 Isidora Goreshter as Svetlana
 Nichole Bloom as Amanda
 Emma Greenwell as Mandy Milkovich
 Dichen Lachman as Angela
 Alessandra Balazs as Jackie Scabello
 Axle Whitehead as Davis
 Michael Patrick McGill as Tommy
 Jim Hoffmaster as Kermit
 Patrick Fischler as Wade Shelton
 Stacy Edwards as Laura Shelton
 Michael Reilly Burke as Theo Wallace Robinson
 Luca Oriel as Derek Delgado
 Danika Yarosh as Holly Herkimer
 Vanessa Bell Calloway as Carol Fisher
 J. Michael Trautmann as Iggy Milkovich
 Shel Bailey as Kenyatta
 Stephen Rider as G-Dogg
 James Allen McCune as Matty
 Miguel Izaguirre as Paco

Episodes

Development and production
On February 18, 2014, Showtime announced the series would be renewed for a fifth season. Production on the first episode began on July 3, 2014 with the first table read, with principal photography commencing on July 8, 2014.

Reception
Review aggregator Rotten Tomatoes gives the fifth season a 92%, based on 12 reviews. The critics consensus reads, "Settling into its fifth year with a irascible sense of fun, Shameless hints that the Gallaghers won't become a functional family unit anytime soon - but audiences will adore them all the same."

References

External links
 
 

2015 American television seasons
Shameless (American TV series)
Teenage pregnancy in television